In certain sports, when a sportsman wins three crowns, titles, medals, belts or other distinctions, the athlete is called a triple champion.

Boxing
 
In boxing, a triple champion is a boxer who has won world titles in three weight classes.

For most of the 20th century it was a remarkable achievement, possibly securing one a spot in the International Boxing Hall of Fame with other immortals of the sport. Beginning in the 1970s, triple champions have become increasingly more common because of the numerous weight divisions (17) and the countless professional boxing entities that claim a "world" championship.

The first triple champion of boxing was Bob Fitzsimmons when he added the Light Heavyweight (175 lbs) crown to his World Middleweight (160 lbs) and Heavyweight (200+ lbs) belts on November 25, 1903.

Barney Ross was the first boxer to simultaneously hold world titles in two different weight classes when he won World Lightweight (135 lbs) title and World Light Welterweight (140 lbs) against Tony Canzoneri on June 23, 1933. Later Ross won the World Welterweight (147 lbs) Title from Jimmy McLarnin on May 28, 1934.

Henry Armstrong was the first man to hold three titles in three divisions simultaneously. He won the World Featherweight (126 lbs) title from Petey Sarron on October 29, 1937, the World Welterweight (147) title from Barney Ross on May 31, 1938, and won the World Lightweight Title (135 lbs) in his next fight, on August 17 against Lou Ambers. Armstrong then immediately vacated the Featherweight Title because he could no longer make the weight.

Wilfred Benítez was the youngest ever champion at any weight. Benitez first won the WBA Light Welterweight (140 lbs) Title from Antonio Cervantes on March 6, 1976, at age 17. He moved up in weight to win the WBC Welterweight (147 lbs) title from Carlos Palomino on January 14, 1979, and finally won a third title when he added the WBC Light Middleweight (154 lbs) title from Maurice Hope on May 23, 1981.

When boxing organizations started to create additional divisions or weight classes (there were only eight divisions originally when modern title lineages began being generally recognized around 1890), it became possible for boxers to reach new milestones in boxing, such as the quadruple and  Quintuple Champions.

Grappling & Wrestling
In grappling type martial arts, a triple champion is someone who has won a championship, medal (gold, silver or bronze) or a tournament in all three categories:
-Mixed Martial Arts (MMA)
-Professional Wrestling
- and in either Brazilian jiu-jitsu, Amateur Wrestling or Judo.

Brock Lesnar and Ronda Rousey are examples on the professional level.

Combat Sports
In general combat sports, a triple champion (or triple crown champion) is someone who wins a championship belt in all three categories: Striking (Boxing or Kickboxing), Grappling and Mixed Martial Arts (MMA). This is considered the most prestigious accomplishments in all combat sports.

It is worth noting that boxing, grappling and MMA each have their own respective triple champion title within each individual sport.

Formula One
Jackie Stewart, Niki Lauda, Nelson Piquet and Ayrton Senna are all triple world champions.

Touring Car racing
Andy Priaulx and José María López both won three world championships.

See also
List of boxing triple champions
List of boxing quadruple champions
List of boxing quintuple champions
List of boxing sextuple champions
List of boxing septuple champions
List of The Ring world champions
List of WBC world champions
List of WBA world champions
List of IBF world champions
List of WBO world champions
List of IBO world champions

External links
Boxrec.com - title search 
Boxing Records 
Saddoboxing  
Yahoo - Boxing 
IBHOF 
Cyberboxingzone 
True Champions Of Boxing 

Boxing champions